Somatidia flavidorsis is a species of beetle in the family Cerambycidae. It was described by Broun in 1917. It is known from New Zealand.

Varietas
 Somatidia flavidorsis var. vittigera Broun, 1921
 Somatidia flavidorsis var. origana Broun, 1921

References

flavidorsis
Beetles described in 1917